Wijekoon Mudiyanselage Gayan Ramyakumara (more commonly known as Gayan Wijekoon; born 21 December 1976) is a former Sri Lankan cricketer, who played 2 Tests and 3 T20Is for Sri Lanka. He is a left-handed batsman and a left-hand medium-pace bowler.

Domestic career
Despite having played on several occasions for the Sri Lankan A team, he is yet to make the same impact for his country's full squad, with little but a selection to the New Zealand-touring squad of 2004/05. Before joining the Chilaw Marians, he opened the batting for Tamil Union. He made his Twenty20 debut on 17 August 2004, for Chilaw Marians Cricket Club in the 2004 SLC Twenty20 Tournament.

References

External links
 

1976 births
Living people
Sri Lanka Test cricketers
Sri Lanka Twenty20 International cricketers
Sri Lankan cricketers
Basnahira North cricketers
Tamil Union Cricket and Athletic Club cricketers
Sinhalese Sports Club cricketers
Chilaw Marians Cricket Club cricketers
Wayamba cricketers
North Central Province cricketers
Cricketers at the 2010 Asian Games
Asian Games competitors for Sri Lanka